The Gaumont-Palace was a cinema located on Rue Caulaincourt in the French capital Paris. Originally constructed between 1898 and 1900 as the  Hippodrome de Montmartre, it staged equestrian shows during its early years. It was originally built with a Belle Époque facade. The site was acquired by Léon Gaumont in 1907 and converted into a cinema. It remained part of the Gaumont Film Company empire throughout its history.

In 1931, Gaumont reconstructed the cinema, with a new Art Deco exterior. The largest cinema in France, it was used to premiere major productions from both France and abroad. With a capacity of 6,000, it commonly attracted between fifty and sixty thousand spectators a week in the early 1930s. The size of the cinema meant that it rarely held films over for more than two weeks before they were switched to smaller venues in the city such as the Caméo cinema.

In 1952, the cinema featured in the comedy film Holiday for Henrietta. In 1962, it was converted for the use of Cinerama widescreen format. Increasingly, its large size was considered a disadvantage, due to poor audio quality. Plans were made for a further reconstruction but these were abandoned. In 1972, Gaumont sold off the site and it was demolished in 1973 and redeveloped. The money the company received from its sale allowed it to renovate other parts of its cinema chain, including in Lille, Lyon, Marseilles, Bordeaux, Reims, Nice and Toulouse.

References

Bibliography
 Abel, Richard. The Cine Goes to Town: French Cinema, 1896-1914. University of California Press, 1998.
 Crisp, Colin. Genre, Myth and Convention in the French Cinema, 1929-1939. Indiana University Press, 2002.

Cinemas in Paris
Former cinemas
Cinemas in France
Demolished buildings and structures in Paris
Buildings and structures demolished in 1973